A Lomond still is a type of still that was sometimes used for whisky distillation, invented in 1955 by Alistair
Cunningham of Hiram Walker. It is used for batch distillation like a pot still, but has three perforated plates which can be cooled independently, controlling the reflux through the apparatus in a manner similar to coffey stills. This allows the distiller to produce different kinds of whisky in the same still. Lomond stills were installed at the Loch Lomond distillery for which it was initially designed, and the Glenburgie, Miltonduff, Inverleven and Scapa distilleries. For a time, the only remaining Lomond still was in the Scapa distillery, where it is used as a wash still, in combination with a traditional pot still. In 2010, Bruichladdich distillery installed the original still salvaged from the demolished Inverleven distillery. In 2015 new Lomond stills were installed at InchDairnie distillery.
Loch Lomond Distillery has Lomond Stills installed, though it is unknown how long they have been there.

References

Distillation